The 1979 World trials season consisted of twelve trials events. It began on 10 February, with round one in Newtownards, Ireland and ended with round twelve in Ricany, Czechoslovakia on 16 September.

Season summary
Bernie Schreiber would claim his first World trials championship in 1979, the first American to win the FIM World Trials Championship.

1979 World trials season calendar

Scoring system
Points were awarded to the top ten finishers. All twelve rounds counted for the World Trials class.

World Trials final standings

{|
|

References

1979 in motorcycle sport